Major General Albert Cecil Fewtrell,  (12 March 1885 – 16 October 1950) was an Australian railway engineer and a senior officer in the Australian Army during the Second World War.

References

1885 births
1950 deaths
Military personnel from Chester
Australian Companions of the Distinguished Service Order
Australian Companions of the Order of the Bath
Australian generals
Australian military personnel of World War I
Australian Army personnel of World War II
Australian railway mechanical engineers
British emigrants to colonial Australia
People from Chester